Robert Gys (1901–1977) was a French art director.

Selected filmography
 Imperial Violets (1924)
 The Phantom of the Moulin Rouge (1925)
 Miss Europe (1930)
 Dance Hall (1931)
 The Dream (1931)
 Imperial Violets (1932)
 The Barber of Seville (1933)
 The Concierge's Daughters (1934)
 The Scandal (1934)
 Gold in the Street (1934)
 The Mysteries of Paris (1935)
 Divine (1935)
 Pasteur (1935)
 The Last Waltz (1936)
 Let's Make a Dream (1936)
 The New Men (1936)
 Compliments of Mister Flow (1936)
 The Two Boys (1936)
 The Cheat (1937)
 Alert in the Mediterranean (1938)
 The Lafarge Case (1938)
 The Fatted Calf (1939)
 Sacred Woods (1939)
 Whirlwind of Paris (1939)
 Carmen (1942)
 Voyage Without Hope (1943)
 The Bellman (1945)
 Goodbye Darling (1946)
 A Friend Will Come Tonight (1946)
 Ballerina (1950)
 The Cape of Hope (1951)
 When You Read This Letter (1953)
 Madame du Barry (1954)
 Typhoon Over Nagasaki (1957)

References

Bibliography
 Martin O'Shaughnessy. Jean Renoir. Manchester University Press, 2000.

External links

1901 births
1977 deaths
French art directors